Bishop's Glen Reservoir  also known as  Dunoon Reservoir  used to be the source for drinking water for the town of Dunoon on the Cowal peninsula, Argyll and Bute, Scotland, a function now satisfied via Loch Eck. Records show that this impounding reservoir was created before 1880.  The Balgaidh Burn is the main inflow and outflow.

The angling of the Bishops Glen Reservoir is managed by the Dunoon and District Angling Club.

See also

 List of reservoirs and dams in the United Kingdom

References

Sources
"Argyll and Bute Council Reservoirs Act 1975 Public Register"

External links

 Dunoon and District Angling Club, Bishops Glen page - website

Landforms of Dunoon
Reservoirs in Argyll and Bute
Highlands and Islands of Scotland
Glens of Cowal